The Australia women's national 3x3 team is a national basketball team of Australia, governed by Basketball Australia.

The Australians are one of the best teams in the world. They competed twice on the Women's Series 2019 and won both times, while they finished fourth at the World Cup 2019. Top players include  Bec Cole and Maddie Garrick.

Competitions

Summer Olympics

3x3 World Cup

3x3 Asia Cup

Commonwealth Games

Honours

Medals table

Individual awards
 FIBA 3x3 Asia Cup MVP
 Isabelle Bourne – 2017
 Rebecca Cole – 2019
 FIBA 3x3 Asia Cup All-Tournament Team
 Isabelle Bourne – 2017
 Rebecca Cole – 2018, 2019

See also

Australia men's national 3x3 team
 Australia women's national basketball team
 Australia men's national basketball team

References

Women's national 3x3 basketball teams
Australia women's national basketball team